Andrew Driscoll (born 21 October 1971) is an English retired professional footballer and manager who played in the Football League for Brentford. A knee injury saw Driscoll released in 1992 and he dropped into non-League football. He now works as a personal trainer.

Playing career

Brentford
After beginning his career in the youth systems at Queens Park Rangers and West Ham United, Driscoll joined the youth team at Third Division club Brentford in September 1988. He was a part of the youth team which reached the semi-finals of the 1988–89 FA Youth Cup. Driscoll made his first team debut in a 4–2 defeat to Bolton Wanderers on 6 May 1989, coming on as a substitute for Andy Feeley. He remained out of the first team picture until an injury to Eddie May saw Driscoll play the final 12 games of the 1989–90 season on the right wing, scoring two goals. Driscoll signed a professional contract at the end of the season, but suffered a serious knee ligament injury during 1990–91 pre-season. After returning to fitness, he managed just one further appearance before his release by the Bees at the end of the 1991–92 season. Driscoll made 14 appearances and scored two goals for the club.

Non-League football 
After failed trials with league clubs Reading and Torquay United in 1992, Driscoll went on to enjoy a long career in non-League football, playing in the Isthmian, Southern, Spartan South Midlands and the Hellenic Leagues for Yeading, Chertsey Town, Hayes, Hendon, Crawley Town, St Albans City, Staines Town, Brook House, Ashford Town (Middlesex), Marlow, Hounslow Borough, Flackwell Heath, Maidenhead United, Burnham and Walton & Hersham. He also briefly played in New Zealand for Papatoetoe.

Managerial career 
Driscoll had his first taste of management as player-assistant manager under former Brentford teammate Chris Sparks at Hellenic League First Division South club Hounslow Borough between May and December 2004. Driscoll later had two spells as player-manager at Isthmian League Second Division club Flackwell Heath.

Conditioning coach career 
Driscoll was appointed by former Brentford teammate Paul Buckle as a performance and fitness coach when Buckle managed Torquay United (2009–2011), Bristol Rovers (2011–2012) and Luton Town (2012–2013). In July 2014, Driscoll returned to Staines Town, where he was enlisted by former Brentford teammate Marcus Gayle to condition the players at the Conference South club.

Personal life 
Driscoll has worked as a personal trainer since 1996, specialising in football, golf and athletics performance and fitness.

Career statistics

References

1971 births
Living people
English footballers
Association football midfielders
People from Staines-upon-Thames
English Football League players
Brentford F.C. players
Staines Town F.C. players
Yeading F.C. players
Chertsey Town F.C. players
Papatoetoe AFC players
Hayes F.C. players
St Albans City F.C. players
Hendon F.C. players
Crawley Town F.C. players
Walton & Hersham F.C. players
A.F.C. Hayes players
Ashford Town (Middlesex) F.C. players
Marlow F.C. players
Hounslow Borough F.C. players
Flackwell Heath F.C. players
Burnham F.C. players
Maidenhead United F.C. players
Flackwell Heath F.C. managers
Bristol Rovers F.C. non-playing staff
Torquay United F.C. non-playing staff
Luton Town F.C. non-playing staff
West Ham United F.C. players
Queens Park Rangers F.C. players
English expatriate footballers
English expatriate sportspeople in New Zealand
Expatriate association footballers in New Zealand
English football managers